The Hawke Cup is a non-first-class cricket competition for New Zealand's district associations. Apart from 1910–11, 1912–13 and 2000–01 the competition has always been on a challenge basis. To win the Hawke Cup, the challengers must beat the holders, either outright or on the first innings in a drawn match, on the holders' home ground.

Teams from New Zealand's four main centres, Auckland, Wellington, Christchurch and Dunedin, have not usually competed for the Hawke Cup, although they did participate in the latter half of the 1990s. They were excluded again from the 2000–01 season.

From 2000 to 2010 the team from Hamilton, New Zealand's fourth-largest urban area, was the most successful. Since then the title has changed hands numerous times, Manawatu, Hawke's Bay, Bay of Plenty and Canterbury Country being prominent. In 2012-13 Hamilton conceded the highest-ever score in the Hawke Cup of 701 against Bay of Plenty. This record score was equalled again by Bay of Plenty against Counties Manukau during their first defence of the Hawke Cup in 2017. Owing to COVID-19 restrictions, the last two matches of the 2021-22 competition were postponed until the 2022-23 season.

Origin
The Plunket Shield, New Zealand's premier cricket competition for its first-class teams, was inaugurated in 1907. In 1910 Lord Hawke donated a challenge cup for competition among the minor associations. The first match, in December 1910, resulted in a victory to Manawatu over Wairarapa. The first holders, decided in the final match of the 1910-11 competition, were Southland.

Title holders

1910-11 to 1999-2000

From 1985–86 to 1994-95 the competition was called the U-Bix Cup; from 1995–96 to 1997-98 it was the Fuji Xerox Cup; in 1998-99 it was the National District Championship.

2000-01 to the present

Records

Teams
Nelson has the record for holding the Cup for the longest period and the most challenges. Between 1958 and 1965 Nelson resisted 28 challenges. Manawatu resisted 15 challenges between 1934 and 1938, as did Southland between 1989 and 1992.

The highest team score is 701, made by Bay of Plenty twice: in 2013 and 2017.

Players
Current players can only play a maximum of four Hawke Cup challenge matches a season, and that is only for members of the team holding the Hawke Cup and defeating every challenger (first defence within their own zone and defeating the winners of the other three zones). Historically there have been between two and six challenge matches every season for the holders, so it has been difficult for players to build much of a record unless they have been part of a strong team and have had a lengthy career. Nevertheless, 19 players have scored 1000 runs and five players have taken 100 wickets.

The highest score in the competition is 272 not out, by Mick Kinzett for Nelson against Marlborough in the 1933–34 season. The best bowling figures in an innings in a challenge match are 10 for 35 by Chester Holland for Wanganui against South Taranaki in 1922–23. Outside the challenge matches, the best bowling figures in an innings are 10 for 24 by Ben Stark for Marlborough in a qualifying match against West Coast in 2012-13.

Current structure
There are four regional zones in the Hawke Cup.

After a round robin within each zone, the winners of each zone get a Hawke Cup Challenge as part of the challenge series against the current holders on a rotational basis. For example 2010-11 holders North Otago played the winner of their own zone (Otago Country) in the first challenge (or the second place team should they win their own zone) followed by challenges by the winners of zone 3, 2 and 1.

The team with the Hawke Cup at the end of the challenge series holds it for the winter. Hawke Cup games are played over three days. To win the Hawke Cup a challenger must beat the holder outright or win on the first innings on the holder's home ground.

Teams
More than forty teams have competed for the Hawke Cup. In the following list, current teams are indicated in bold. 

Many boundaries, both political-administrative and cricket-administrative, have been redrawn since the competition began. The Counties Manukau team, for example, succeeded the former Franklin team, but their districts are not identical.

Team of the Century
In January 2011, to mark 100 years of Hawke Cup cricket, an official "Team of the Century" was named. Selection was based on the player's outstanding performances in the Hawke Cup and also on their contribution to their district while playing. In batting order:

 Mike Wright (wk) – Bay of Plenty
 Roger Pierce – Nelson
 Robert Anderson – Southland, Northland and Manawatu
 Richard Hoskin – Southland and Central Otago
 Brian Dunning – Northland
 Ian Leggat – Nelson and Hawke's Bay
 Barry Hampton – Nelson 
 Dave Spence – Nelson 
 Gren Alabaster (captain) – Southland
 Alistar Jordan – Taranaki
 Russell Merrin – North Canterbury
 Norman Gallichan (12th man) – Manawatu

See also

References

External links
 A scoreboard of almost every Hawke Cup Challenge game ever played 
 Hawke Cup at New Zealand Cricket

New Zealand domestic cricket competitions
Sports leagues established in 1910
1910 establishments in New Zealand